Hybanthus concolor, commonly known as eastern green violet, is a flowering plant in the violet family (Violaceae). It is native to eastern North America, where it is found through much of the interior areas of the eastern United States and Ontario, Canada.

Description
Green violet is a shrub-like herb that grows to a height of 30 cm to 1 m.
Its inconspicuous flowers are small, close to the stem, and green. It blooms from May to June in Ontario and from April to June in Connecticut.

Habitat
The natural habitat of Hybanthus concolor is in nutrient rich, calcareous forests and woodlands, typically in mesic or bottomland conditions. It is found less frequently in dry forests and glades. It is a fairly conservative species, and is only found in areas with an intact native herbaceous layer.   

Most of the Canadian populations are located along the Niagara Escarpment, a prime habitat for green violet.

References

concolor
Flora of North America